The Diakonie Deutschland is a charitable organization of Protestant churches in Germany (Evangelical Church in Germany), Austria as well as numerous free churches. Its Roman Catholic equivalent is the Caritas.

Evangelical Church in Germany
Charities based in Germany
Charities based in Austria